Nick Takes Over Your School is the title of a Nickelodeon Australia reality show that ran from 1998 - 2004.

Format
Nickelodeon Australia Personalities would visit schools around Australia, have a look around, and feature a game with kids vs. teachers. The teachers would generally lose, and kids were given pieces of Nickelodeon Merchandise.

Host
Lizzie Trevan hosted the first six series. In the seventh series of the show, Dave Lawson, a well known Nickelodeon Australia Personality, was the host.

Cancellation
After the seventh series of the show, Nickelodeon Australia decided to cancel "Nick Takes Over Your School" to focus more on "Sarvo" and "Saturday Nick Television". Saturday Nick Television was cancelled one year later.

See also
 Nickelodeon Australia
 XYZnetworks - owner of Nickelodeon Australia
 Dave Lawson
 Sarvo
 Saturday Nick Television
 Camp Orange - a reality television series aired on Nickelodeon Australia, often seen as a replacement of Nick Takes Over Your School.
 Camp Orange: Slimey Hollow

References

Nick Takes Over Your School